Global Linguist Solutions (GLS) is an American Professional Services contracting company headquartered in Herndon, VA. GLS is the main provider of interpreters, translators, and linguistic support to the U.S. military effort in Iraq.

Company Profile

History

GLS was created in 2006 as a joint venture between DynCorp International and McNeil Technologies with DynCorp as the majority partner. McNeil Technologies was acquired by  AECOM Technology Corporation in August 2010 for $355M.

In December 2006, GLS was awarded a $4.6 Billion, five-year contract  to manage translation and interpretation services in support of the U.S. Army Intelligence and Security Command (INSCOM), based out of Ft. Belvoir, VA. The contract provides linguistic services to the U.S. Army as well as any other U.S. government agencies supporting Operation Iraqi Freedom, now Operation New Dawn.

This award of contract award was protested by the incumbent, L-3 Communications, and "was sustained by the General Accountability Office (GAO). The U.S. Army expedited a Request for Reconsideration with the GAO, and the U.S. Army INSCOM issued a revised Request for Proposal."

GLS was then awarded the contract for a second time in December 2007 after a year of protests. Protests were again made by L-3 Communications, after which "the Army announced that it would take 'corrective action' including conducting a new evaluation of offerors' cost proposals and a re-evaluation of offerors' past performance, and make a new award decision. INSCOM completed this process and, on February 15, 2008, selected GLS for the award a third time."

In July 2011, GLS was selected as one of six providers to compete on multiple task orders released under the $9.7 billion Department of Defense Language Interpretation Translation Enterprise (DLITE) contract. This contract, awarded by the Department of the Army, provides translation and interpretation services for personnel, equipment, supplies, facilities, transportation, tools, materials and supervision for Force Projection Operations mission areas.

Leadership

Chief Executive Officers and General Managers

Major General James A. (Spider) Marks was the company's first CEO until his resignation in April 2009. Spider attended the U.S. Military Academy at West Point for his bachelor's degree in Engineering, followed by a Master's in International Affairs from the University of Virginia and with an MS in Theater Operations from the School of Advanced Military Studies at the U.S. Army Command and General Staff College. Before serving as the CEO of GLS, Spider was the Commanding General of the U.S. Army Intelligence Center at Ft. Huachuca, Arizona. He retired from the U.S. Army in 2004. He is a frequent contributor to the BBC and was also a military analyst for CNN

Spider was succeeded by John Houck as the General Manager until his departure in September 2010.  John holds a master's degree in information resource management from Marymount University and a bachelor's degree in public administration/political science from Virginia Commonwealth University. He has worked for Northrop Grumman as a program manager and served as a project manager at DynCorp. In September 2010 he accepted a position as the Chief Operating Officer (COO) of McNeil Technologies, now AECOM National Security Programs.

In September 2010, Dr. Charles (Chuck) Tolleson became the President and General Manager of GLS. Chuck holds a doctoral degree in Organizational Management and is a career military officer with nearly 10 years of experience in executive contracting in the Departments of Defense and Energy, specializing in quality, strategy, processes, systems and management assessments. Chuck holds certifications as a Project Management Professional (PMP), as an RAB certified ISO 9001 Auditor, is Six Sigma Black Belt, and as an ASQ Quality Manager/Organizational Effectiveness and Improvement professional. In November 2013, Chuck was succeeded by Frank Calderon, who assumed the position of General Manager.

In August 2014, Tom Fish became General Manager.  In January 2015, he was promoted to President & General Manager. Tom holds a master of business administration degree in International Business and Entrepreneurship from Regent University, a master of arts degree in East Asian Studies from the University of Washington (Seattle, WA), and a bachelor's degree from the United States Military Academy at West Point, NY, where he concentrated in Latin American Studies.  During his military career Tom held leadership and staff positions as an infantry officer, and he served in operations Desert Shield and Desert Storm.  Tom was trained as a foreign area officer and served as Director of Training at US Army Japan, Assistant Army Attache at the United States Embassy in Tokyo, Japan and as a senior analyst at the Defense Intelligence Agency in Washington, DC.  Tom retired from the military in 2002 and began a career in business, specializing in providing support services to the U.S. Department of Defense and the Intelligence Community. Tom has led operations and business development efforts at various levels in CSC, McMunn Associates Inc., Parsons Infrastructure and Technology Group Inc., KMS Solutions LLC, Mission Essential Personnel LLC, and Go Beyond LLC.

Headquarters

GLS is headquartered in Herndon, VA with operating hubs in Kuwait, Bahrain, and Kosovo.

Products, Services, and Performance

Products and Services

As of September 2011, GLS offers translation and interpretation in the following countries:
 Iraq
 Kuwait
 The Kingdom of Saudi Arabia
 Qatar
 Bahrain
 The United Arab Emirates
 Jordan
 Oman
 Yemen
 United States (multiple locations)

As of September 2011, GLS has linguistic capabilities in the following languages:
 Albanian
 Arabic
 Bengali
 Dari
 Hebrew
 Hindi
 Indonesian
 Japanese
 Kurdish
 Malayalam
 Nepali
 Pashtu
 Persian
 Punjabi
 Russian
 Serbian
 Singhalese
 Spanish
 Portuguese
 Tagalog
 Thai
 Turkish
 Turkoman
 Urdu

Performance

In August 2008, GLS was the subject of a hearing in front of the  Commission on Wartime Contracting in Iraq and Afghanistan (CWC) regarding questionable costs and poor management of the contract after its award in February 2008. When auditors went into Iraq to examine the performance of GLS, they "found about $5 million being spent on three-bedroom apartments and automobile for individual contractor employees. At the same time, the company was slow getting linguists into Iraq."

The CWC released its final report after the investigations on August 31, 2011 entitled "Transforming Wartime Contracting: Controlling Costs, Reducing Risks".

An improvement from past performance, GLS earned its second consecutive 100% award fee score on the INSCOM contract in the 3rd quarter 2010. GLS has also reported that it has received its 6th consecutive "outstanding" award fee from the government in Q1 2011.

In 2013 US Linguists, which were working for GLS in Kuwait through a Kuwaiti sponsorship company, faced a lot of difficulties because of a dispute between GLS and the sponsorship company. As a result, for a period of time nearly 100 American civilians working as Arabic linguists on camps Buehring and Arifjan, two major Army bases in the Middle East, were unable to leave either post because they were at risk of being detained by Kuwaiti police, who have no authority inside base gates. As many as nine linguists were detained outside the gates, held in Kuwaiti cells and flown back to the U.S., according to linguists interviewed and their employer. The situation was resolved.

In 2015 GLS has started supporting the US Department of Defense cooperation with Ukraine, also using a Romanian Subcontractor to hire local national linguists. There are significant discrepancies between linguists' job offers and reality (no insurance, lack of gear, poor living conditions etc.). Nevertheless, having understanding of the mission importance, linguists started work and got positive feedback about their actual performance. The long delay of first monthly payment for translators was the last straw which caused translators strike. Facing the possibility of multinational scandal, GLS with Subcontractor managed first payment only and asked translators to continue working. Despite that next payments made on time, GLS breached its written promise to linguists about payment increase from Dec 15 according to working hours increase, in fact linguists' gross salary remains same while working hours increased by 80%. All other GLS and Subcontractor promises (both written and oral) to resolve other crucial issues in new contracts with translators are still overdue, which makes this GLS mission vulnerable.

Awards

The research firm Common Sense Advisory listed GLS as the 3rd largest language service provider in the world, with revenues of $435 million for 2010 by Common Sense Advisory.

GLS parent company, DynCorp International, made Washington Technology's Top 100 Government Contractors list in 2010.

References

External links 
 Global Linguist Solutions Official Website

American companies established in 2006
Defense companies of the United States
Iraq War
Translation companies